Bahangar (also Romanized as Bahangar and Bahongar; also known as Bahāngar and Kolā Khūnī) is a village in Mehr Rural District, Bashtin District, Davarzan County, Razavi Khorasan Province, Iran. At the 2017 census, its population was 123, in 45 families.

References 

Populated places in Davarzan County